Buckland Hill Reservoir is situated in Mosman Park, Western Australia,  southwest of the Perth central business district. The covered reservoir is the most westerly in the Perth metropolitan area. The reservoir was originally filled with water from Perth's hill dams and features a water treatment plant.  In 1935 Buckland Hill supplied water to the area from Fremantle to Claremont.

The reservoir position sweeping views across Gage Roads of Rottnest Island, Garden Island and the Port of Fremantle and mouth of the Swan River to the west and Lucky Bay and Bicton and East Fremantle to the east.

History
The reservoir was built in 1925 on top of a limestone ridge adjacent to the Buckland Hill lighthouse. When the reservoir was roofed in 1983 the obelisk was moved west to its current location.

In 1941, the reservoir shared the hill with the Australian Army's Leighton Battery. The area around the reservoir is a popular parking place.

See also
List of reservoirs and dams in Australia

References

Further reading
 
  
Early history of Perth
Water Corporation

History of Western Australia
Reservoirs in Western Australia
Mosman Park, Western Australia